Enneapterygius is a genus of fish in the family Tripterygiidae found in the Indian and Pacific Ocean.

Species
There are currently 63 recognized species in this genus:
 Enneapterygius abeli (Klausewitz, 1960) (Yellow triplefin)
 Enneapterygius altipinnis E. Clark, 1980 
 Enneapterygius atriceps (O. P. Jenkins, 1903) (Hawaiian black-head triplefin)
 Enneapterygius atrogulare (Günther, 1873) (Black-throat triplefin)
 Enneapterygius bahasa R. Fricke, 1997
 Enneapterygius cheni S. C. Wang, K. T. Shao & S. C. Shen, 1996 	 
 Enneapterygius clarkae Holleman, 1982 (Barred triplefin)
 Enneapterygius clea R. Fricke, 1997 (Clea's triplefin)
 Enneapterygius destai E. Clark, 1980 	 
 Enneapterygius elaine Holleman, 2005 	 
 Enneapterygius elegans (W. K. H. Peters, 1876) (Hourglass triplefin)
 Enneapterygius etheostomus (D. S. Jordan & Snyder, 1902) 	 
 Enneapterygius fasciatus (M. C. W. Weber, 1909) (Banded triplefin)
 Enneapterygius flavoccipitis S. C. Shen, 1994 (Yellow-nape triplefin)
 Enneapterygius fuscoventer R. Fricke, 1997 (Black-belly triplefin)
 Enneapterygius genamaculatus Holleman, 2005
 Enneapterygius gracilis R. Fricke, 1994 (Northern yellow-black triplefin)
 Enneapterygius gruschkai Holleman, 2005 	 
 Enneapterygius hemimelas (Kner & Steindachner, 1867) (Half-black triplefin)
 Enneapterygius hollemani J. E. Randall, 1995 (Holleman's triplefin)
 Enneapterygius howensis R. Fricke, 1997 (Lord Howe Island triplefin)
 Enneapterygius hsiojenae S. C. Shen, 1994
 Enneapterygius kermadecensis R. Fricke, 1994 (Kermadec triplefin)
 Enneapterygius kosiensis Holleman, 2005 	 
 Enneapterygius larsonae R. Fricke, 1994 (Western Australian black-head triplefin)
 Enneapterygius leucopunctatus S. C. Shen, 1994 (White-spotted triplefin)
 Enneapterygius melanospilus J. E. Randall, 1995 	 
 Enneapterygius minutus (Günther, 1877) 	 
 Enneapterygius mirabilis R. Fricke, 1994 (Miracle triplefin)
 Enneapterygius miyakensis R. Fricke, 1987 (Izu Islands triplefin)
 Enneapterygius namarrgon R. Fricke, 1997 (Lightning-man triplefin)
 Enneapterygius nanus (L. P. Schultz, 1960) (Pygmy triplefin)
 Enneapterygius niger R. Fricke, 1994 (Black triplefin)
 Enneapterygius nigricauda R. Fricke, 1997 (Black-tail triplefin)
 Enneapterygius niue R. Fricke & Erdmann, 2017 (Red-bar triplefin) 
 Enneapterygius obscurus E. Clark, 1980 	 
 Enneapterygius ornatus R. Fricke, 1997 (Henderson triplefin)
 Enneapterygius pallidoserialis R. Fricke, 1997 (Pale white-spotted triplefin)
 Enneapterygius pallidus E. Clark, 1980 	 
 Enneapterygius paucifasciatus R. Fricke, 1994 (New Caledonian striped triplefin)
 Enneapterygius philippinus (W. K. H. Peters, 1868) (Minute triplefin)
 Enneapterygius phoenicosoma Motomura, R. Ota & Meguro, 2015 (Red-bodied triplefin) 
 Enneapterygius pusillus Rüppell, 1835 (High-crest triplefin)
 Enneapterygius pyramis R. Fricke, 1994 (Pyramid triplefin)
 Enneapterygius qirmiz Holleman & Bogorodsky, 2012 
 Enneapterygius randalli R. Fricke, 1997 (Rapa triplefin)
 Enneapterygius rhabdotus R. Fricke, 1994 (Umpire triplefin)
 Enneapterygius rhothion R. Fricke, 1997 (Surf triplefin)
 Enneapterygius rubicauda S. C. Shen,  1994 (Red-tail triplefin)
 Enneapterygius rufopileus (Waite, 1904) (Red-cap triplefin)
 Enneapterygius senoui Motomura, Harazaki & Hardy, 2005
 Enneapterygius shaoi M. C. Chiang & I. S. Chen, 2008 	 
 Enneapterygius sheni M. C. Chiang & I. S. Chen, 2008 	 
 Enneapterygius signicauda R. Fricke, 1997 (Flag-tail triplefin)
 Enneapterygius similis R. Fricke, 1997 (Black-and-Red triplefin)
 Enneapterygius triserialis R. Fricke, 1994
 Enneapterygius trisignatus R. Fricke, 2001
 Enneapterygius tutuilae D. S. Jordan & Seale, 1906 (High-hat triplefin)
 Enneapterygius unimaculatus R. Fricke, 1994 (One-spot triplefin)
 Enneapterygius ventermaculus Holleman, 1982 (Blotched triplefin)
 Enneapterygius vexillarius Fowler, 1946 (Black-saddle triplefin)
 Enneapterygius williamsi R. Fricke, 1997 (William's triplefin)
 Enneapterygius ziegleri R. Fricke, 1994 (Ziegler's triplefin)

References

 
Marine fish genera
Taxa named by Eduard Rüppell